Riello (Rieḷḷu) is one of thirteen parishes (administrative divisions) in Teverga, a municipality within the province and autonomous community of Asturias, in northern Spain.

The postal code is 33111.

Villages and hamlets
 La Barrera
 Berrueño
 Coañana
 Monteciello
 Riello
 Las Vegas

References

Parishes in Teverga